The Byzantine Rite, also known as the Greek Rite or the Rite of Constantinople, is a liturgical rite that is identified with the wide range of cultural, devotional, and canonical practices that developed in the Eastern Christian Church of Constantinople.

The canonical hours are very long and complicated, lasting about eight hours (longer during Great Lent) but are abridged outside of large monasteries. An iconostasis, a partition covered with icons, separates the area around the altar from the nave. The sign of the cross, accompanied by bowing, is made very frequently, e.g., more than a hundred times during the divine liturgy, and there is prominent veneration of icons, a general acceptance of the congregants freely moving within the church and interacting with each other, and distinctive traditions of liturgical chanting.

Some traditional practices are falling out of use in modern times in sundry churches and in the diaspora, e.g., the faithful standing during services, bowing and prostrating frequently, and priests, deacons, and monastics always wearing a cassock and other clerical garb even in everyday life (monastics also sleep wearing a cassock) and not shaving or trimming their hair or beards.

In addition to numerous psalms read every day, the entire psalter is read each week, and twice each week during Great Lent, and there are daily readings of other scriptures; also many hymns have quotes from, and references to, the scriptures woven into them. On the numerous fast days there is prescribed abstention from meat and dairy products, and on many fast days also from fish, wine, and the use of oil in cooking. Four fasting seasons are prescribed: Great Lent, Nativity Fast, Apostles' Fast and Dormition Fast. In addition, throughout the year most Wednesdays and Fridays, as well as Mondays in monasteries, are fast days.

History

In its present form, the rite is the product of a long cultural synthesis that developed in the years after the 8th-9th century Iconoclasm, in which monasteries and their cultural contacts with the Holy Land played a decisive role. From the 9th to the 14th centuries, the influence of the Palestinian Rite exerted a dominating influence and the rite has been called a "hybrid" between an earlier ceremonial rite which scholars have dubbed the cathedral rite of Constantinople, called the asmatiki akolouthia ("sung services") and the Palestinian Rite of Jerusalem, the Hagiopolitan (Gr. "of the Holy City") in Greek, chiefly through the monastic typikon of the Mar Saba monastery near Jerusalem. Later developments were usually connected to monasteries at Constantinople and Mt. Athos patronized by the imperial court, such as Studion, whose Rule formed the nucleus of early monastic communities in Bulgaria and the Rus'. In the early modern period, the traditions of the rite received further elaboration from the interface of Christian and Islamic mystical traditions fostered in the Ottoman court.

Before the mid-17th century, the practices of the Russian Church, relatively remote from the great ecclesiastical and cultural centers of Greek Christianity, showed some significant local and textual variation from the rest of the Christian world. The practices of the Russian Church were brought violently in line with the contemporary Greek usage during the reforms of Patriarch Nikon, resulting in relative uniformity across the Eastern Orthodox Church. The resulting  (Rus. schism) split Russian Christianity into the present Russian Orthodox and the historically persecuted Old Believers, who maintained many archaic practices of worship.

Sacred Mysteries
The "Holy Mysteries", or "Sacred Mysteries", or similar, refer to the elements of Holy Communion, the real presence of Christ in the Eucharist, in the texts of the Divine Liturgy, the prayers before and after communion, and elsewhere, as, for example, in the first petition of the ectenia after communion, "Arise! Having partaken of the divine, holy, pure, immortal, heavenly, life-creating, and awesome Mysteries of Christ, let us worthily give thanks to the Lord."

Also termed the sacred mysteries is a broad theological category including the seven sacraments defined in the Western Church but differing slightly in emphasis—stressing their ineffable character and forgoing the intense theological definitions which emerged in the centuries following the Reformation. Although all modern Orthodox churches customarily observe the same seven sacraments as in Catholicism, the number has no dogmatic significance and, up to the 17th century, individual authors varied greatly in the number of rites considered "mysteries". Despite the historical differences, modern Orthodox and Catholic faithful are generally united in viewing the West's seven sacraments and Orthodoxy's looser number of sacred mysteries—seven only by convention—as effectively equivalent. The Catholics regard the two as identical.

Divine Liturgy
The divine liturgy may be celebrated on most days, the exceptions, known as aliturgical days, being in or near Great Lent. Typically, however, the liturgy is celebrated daily only in cathedrals and larger monasteries but elsewhere only on Sundays, major feast days, and some other days, especially during Great Lent.

These three forms of the eucharistic service are in use universal usage:
 The Liturgy of St. John Chrysostom is the one most commonly celebrated throughout the year.
 The Liturgy of St. Basil is celebrated ten times a year.
 The Liturgy of the Presanctified Gifts is celebrated on certain weekdays of Great Lent and of Holy Week.

Daily office

The daily cycle begins with vespers and proceeds throughout the night and day according to the following table:

The typica is used whenever the divine liturgy is not celebrated at its usual time, i.e., when there is a vesperal liturgy or no liturgy at all. On days when the liturgy may be celebrated at its usual hour, the typica follows the sixth hour (or matins, where the custom is to serve the Liturgy then) and the Epistle and Gospel readings for the day are read therein; otherwise, on aliturgical days or when the Liturgy is served at vespers, the typica has a much shorter form and is served between the ninth hour and vespers.

Also, there are Inter-Hours for the First, Third, Sixth and Ninth Hours. These are services of a similar structure to, but briefer than, the hours. Their usage varies with local custom, but generally they are used only during the Nativity Fast, Apostles Fast, and Dormition Fast on days when the Lenten alleluia replaces "God is the Lord" at matins, which may be done at the discretion of the ecclesiarch when the Divine Liturgy is not celebrated.

In addition to these public prayers, there are also private prayers prescribed for both monastics and laypersons; in some monasteries, however, these are read in church. These include Morning and Evening Prayers and prayers (and, in Russia, canons) to be prayed in preparation for receiving the Eucharist.

The full cycle of services are usually served only in monasteries, cathedrals, and other Katholika (sobors). In monasteries and parishes of the Russian tradition, the Third and Sixth Hours are read during the Prothesis ( Liturgy of Preparation); otherwise, the Prothesis is served during matins, the final portion of which is omitted, the Liturgy of the Catechumens beginning immediately after the troparion following the Great Doxology.

The Midnight Office is seldom served in parish churches, except at the Paschal Vigil as the essential office, wherein the burial shroud is removed from the tomb and carried to the altar.

Aggregates
The sundry Canonical Hours are, in practice, grouped together into aggregates so that there are three major times of prayer a day: Evening, Morning and Midday.

The most common groupings are as follows:

Ordinary days
 Evening — Ninth Hour, Vespers, Compline
 Morning Watches — Midnight Office, Matins, First Hour
 Morning — Third Hour, Sixth Hour, and the Divine Liturgy or Typica

Weekdays during Lent
Evening — Great Compline
Morning Watches — Midnight Office, Matins, First Hour
Morning — Third Hour, Sixth Hour, Ninth Hour, Typica, Vespers (sometimes with the Liturgy of the Presanctified Gifts or, on the Annunciation, the Liturgy of Saint John Chrysostom)

When there is an all-night vigil
On the eves before Great Feasts and, in some traditions, on all Sundays, this grouping is used. However, the All-night vigil is usually abridged so as to not last literally "all-night" and may be as short as two hours; on the other hand, on Athos and in the very traditional monastic institutions, that service followed by the hours and Liturgy may last as long as 18 hours.

Afternoon — Ninth Hour, Little Vespers, Compline (where it is not read at the commencement of the Vigil)
Early night — Compline (where it is not the custom for it to follow small vespers), Great Vespers, a reading, Matins, First Hour

When the royal hours are read
Evening — Ninth Hour, Vespers, Compline
Morning Watches — Midnight Office, Matins
Morning — First, Third, Sixth, and Ninth Hours and the Typica

On the eves of Christmas, Theophany, and Annunciation
When the feast is a weekday (or, in the Russian tradition, on any day for Christmas, Theophany), Vespers (with the Liturgy in most instances) is served earlier in the day and so Great Compline functions much as Great vespers does on the vigils of other feast days.

Evening — Great Compline (in some traditions) and, if there be an All-Night Vigil, the reading, matins, first hour.
Morning Watches — (unless there be an all-night vigil) midnight office, matins, first hour.

Sacraments and other services performed as needed

The Holy Mysteries (Sacraments)

Baptism

Baptism transforms the old and sinful person into a new and pure one; the old life, the sins, any mistakes made are gone and a clean slate is given. Through Baptism a person is united to the Body of Christ by becoming a member of the Orthodox Church. During the service, water is blessed. The catechumen is fully immersed in the water three times, once in the name of each of the figures of the Holy Trinity. This is considered to be a death of the "old man" by participation in the crucifixion and burial of Christ, and a rebirth into new life in Christ by participation in his resurrection. Properly a new name is given, which becomes the person's name.

Children of Orthodox families are normally baptized shortly after birth. Converts to Orthodoxy are usually formally baptized into the Orthodox Church, though exceptions are sometimes made. Those who have left Orthodoxy and adopted a new religion, if they return to their Orthodox roots, are usually received back into the church through the mystery of Chrismation.

Properly, the mystery of Baptism is administered by bishops and priests; however, in emergencies any Orthodox Christian can baptize. In such cases, should the person survive the emergency, it is likely that the person will be properly baptized by a priest at some later date. This is not considered to be a second baptism, nor is it imagined that the person is not already Orthodox, but rather it is a fulfillment of the proper form.

The service of Baptism used in Orthodox churches has remained largely unchanged for more than 1500 years. St. Cyril of Jerusalem (d. 386), in his Discourse on the Sacrament of Baptism, describes the service; it is largely consistent with the service currently in use in the early 21st century.

Chrismation

Chrismation grants the gift of the Holy Spirit through anointing with Holy Chrism. It is normally given immediately after baptism as part of the same service. It may also be used to formally receive again lapsed members of the Orthodox Church. As baptism is a person's participation in the death and resurrection of Christ, so chrismation is a person's participation in the coming of the Holy Spirit at Pentecost.

A baptized and chrismated Orthodox Christian is a full member of the Church and may receive the Eucharist regardless of age and, indeed, does so beginning at the first liturgy attended after chrismation, infant communion being the universal norm.

The sanctification of chrism may, in theory, be performed by any bishop at any time, but in longstanding practice is performed no more than once a year by hierarchs of most of the autocephalous churches, although some autocephalous churches obtain their chrism from another church. Anointing with it substitutes for the laying-on of hands described in the New Testament, and according to the prayer of consecration of chrism, the apostles made the initial chrism, laying their hands on it, for priests to substitute for laying on of hands for sundry practices, where only the apostles could perform said laying on of hands.

Holy Communion (Eucharist)

The Eucharist is at the center of Orthodox Christianity. In practice, it is the partaking of the Body and Blood of Jesus Christ in the midst of the Divine Liturgy with the rest of the church. The bread and wine are believed to be transubstantiated as the genuine Body and Blood of the Christ Jesus through the operation of the Holy Spirit.

Communion is given only to baptized Orthodox Christians who have prepared by fasting, prayer and confession. The wine is administered with a spoon directly into the recipient's mouth from the chalice. From baptism young infants and children are carried to the chalice to receive holy communion.

Because of the Orthodox understanding of mankind's fallen nature in general, those who wish to commune prepare themselves in a way that reflects mankind in paradise. First, they prepare by having their confession heard and the prayer of repentance read over them by a priest. They are encouraged to increase their prayer rule, adding the prescribed prayers in preparation for communing. Finally, they fast completely from food, drink, and sexual activity from the evening before, a time interpreted variously in sundry locations as: from arising from sleep, or from midnight, or from sunset the previous evening.

Confession

When one who has committed sins repents of them, wishing to reconcile to God and renew the purity of original baptisms, they confess their sins to God before a spiritual guide who offers advice and direction to assist the individual in overcoming their sin. Parish priests commonly function as spiritual guides, but such guides can be any person, male or female, who has been given a blessing to hear confessions. Spiritual guides are chosen very carefully, as this is a mandate that once chosen must be obeyed. Having confessed, the priest lays his hands on the penitent's head while reciting the prayer of absolution.

Sin is a mistake made by the individual, but there is the opportunity for spiritual growth and development. An act of penance, if the spiritual guide requires it, is never formulaic, but rather is directed toward the individual and their particular problem, as a means of establishing a deeper understanding of the mistake made, and how to effect its cure. Because full participatory membership is granted to infants, it is not unusual for even small children to confess. Though the scope of their culpability is far less than an older child, they also have an opportunity for spiritual growth.

Marriage

From the Eastern Orthodox understanding of marriage, it is one of the holy mysteries or sacraments. As well as in many other Christian traditions, for example in the Catholic Church, it serves to unite a woman and a man in eternal union and love before God, with the purpose of following Christ and His Gospel and raising up a faithful, holy family through their holy union. The church understands marriage to be the union of one man and one woman, and certain Orthodox leaders have spoken out strongly in opposition to the civil institution of same-sex marriage.

Jesus said that "when they rise from the dead, they neither marry nor are given in marriage, but are like angels in heaven" (Mk 12:25). For the Orthodox Christian this passage should not be understood to imply that Christian marriage will not remain a reality in the Kingdom, but points to the fact that relations will not be "fleshy", but "spiritual". Love between wife and husband, as an icon of relationship between Christ and Church, is eternal.

The Church does recognize that there are rare occasions when it is better that couples do separate, but there is no official recognition of civil divorces. For the Orthodox, to say that marriage is indissoluble means that it should not be broken, the violation of such a union, perceived as holy, being an offense resulting from either adultery or the prolonged absence of one of the partners. Thus, permitting remarriage is an act of compassion of the Church towards sinful man. Ecclesiastically divorced Orthodox (not civilly divorced only).

Should a married deacon or priest die, it is common for his wife to retire to a monastery once their children are out of the house. Widowed priests are not allowed to remarry (no priest may be married after his ordination) and also frequently enter monasteries.

The order of a first marriage consists of three distinct services: the Betrothal, the Mystery of Crowning, and the Taking off of the Crowns, but nowadays these are performed in immediate succession. There is no exchange of vows.

Holy Orders

, servant), which became "deacon" in English (see also subdeacon). There are numerous administrative positions among the clergy that carry additional titles.

Bishops are always monks. Although someone who is not a monk may be elected to be a bishop, which frequently happens with widowed priests, he must receive a monastic tonsure before consecration to the episcopate. Deacons and priests, however, are typically married, and it is customary that only monks or married men be ordained. It is considered preferable for parish priests to be married as they often act as counsel to married couples and thus can draw on their own experience. Unmarried priests usually are monks and live in monasteries, though when there is of a shortage of married priests, a monk-priest may be assigned to a parish.

A deacon or priest would have to abandon his orders, i.e. be liaised, to marry after ordination; it is common for widowed clergy to enter a monastery. Also, widowed wives of clergy, who are discouraged from remarrying, often become nuns when their children are grown.

Only men can take holy orders, although deaconesses had both liturgical and pastoral functions within the church. This has fallen out of practice, the last deaconess having been ordained in the 19th century; however, in 2016, Greek Orthodox Church of Alexandria decided to reinstate the order of deaconesses and, in February 2017, Patriarch Theodoros II appointed six nuns to be subdeacons.

Unction
Anointing with oil, often called "unction", is one of the mysteries administered by the Orthodox Church and it is not reserved only for the dying or terminally ill, but for all in need of spiritual or bodily healing, and with reception of this sacrament comes forgiveness of sins. In Greece, during the Ottoman occupation, when parish priests were not allowed to hear confessions, it became the custom to administer this mystery annually on Great Wednesday to all believers so that all could commune the following days through Pascha. In recent decades, this custom has spread to many other locations.

Other services performed as needed

Local variations
Two main strata exist in the rite, those places that have inherited the traditions of the Russian Church which had been given only the monastic Sabbaite typicon which she uses to this day in parishes and cathedrals as well as in monasteries, and everywhere else where some remnant of the cathedral rite remained in use; therefore, the rite as practiced in monasteries everywhere resembles the Russian recension, while non-Russian non-monastic customs differs significantly. For example, in the Russian tradition, the "all-night vigil" is served in every church on Saturday nights and the eves of feast days (although it may be abridged to be as short as two hours) while elsewhere, it is usual to have matins on the morning of the feast; however, in the latter instance, vespers and matins are rather less abridged but the Divine Liturgy commences at the end of matins and the hours are not read, as was the case in the extinct cathedral rite of Constantinople.

Also, as the rite evolved in sundry places, different customs arose; an essay on some of these has been written by Archbishop Basil Krivoshein and is posted on the web.

Liturgical books

 (Church Slavonic:), or Book of Hours, provides the fixed portions of the Daily Cycle of services as used by the Eastern Orthodox and Eastern Catholic churches.

Numerous movable parts of the service are inserted into this fixed framework. These are taken from a variety of liturgical books:

Psalter (Greek: , ; Slavonic:  or) A book containing the 150 Psalms divided into 20 sections called Kathismata together with the 9 Biblical canticles which are chanted at Matins; although these canticles had been chanted in their entirety, having over time come to be supplemented by interspersed hymns (analogously to stichera) to form the Canon, the canticles themselves are now only regularly used in a few large monasteries. The Psalter also contains the various "selected psalms", each composed of verses from a variety of psalms, sung at matins on feast days, as well as tables for determining which Kathismata are to be read at each service; in addition to the Psalms read at the daily offices, all the Psalms are read each week and, during Great Lent, twice a week.
 (Slavonic: ,  or)—Literally, the Book of the "Eight Tones" or modes. This book contains a cycle of eight weeks, one for each of the eight  (church modes of the Byzantine musical system of eight modes), providing texts for each day of the week for Vespers, Matins, Compline, and (on Sundays) the Midnight Office. The origins of this book go back to compositions by St. John Damascene. The (Great)  is also called .  containing only Marianic hymns are called .
 (Slavonic:)—A twelve-volume set which provides liturgical texts for each day of the calendar year, printed as 12 volumes, one for each month of the year. Another volume, the General Menaion contains propers for each class of saints for use when the propers for a particular saint are not available. Additionally, locally venerated saints may have services in supplemental volumes, pamphlets, or manuscripts.
 A collection of the lives of the saints and commentaries on the meaning of feasts for each day of the calendar year, also printed as 12 volumes, appointed to be read at the meal in monasteries and, when there is an all-night vigil for a feast day, between vespers and matins.
 (Slavonic: , ;), also called the Lenten Triodion. The Lenten Triodion contains propers for:
the Pre-Lenten Season
the Forty Days of Great Lent itself
Lazarus Saturday and Palm Sunday
Holy Week
This period can be broken down into the following periods:
Bright Week (Easter Week) Commencing with matins on Pascha (Easter Sunday) through the following Saturday
Paschal Season—The period from Thomas Sunday until Ascension
Ascension and its Afterfeast
Pentecost and its Afterfeast
All Saints Sunday (the Sunday after Pentecost)
—The  contains for each day of the year brief lives of the saints and meanings of celebrated feasts, appointed to be read after the Kontakion and Oikos at Matins.
 (Greek: , ; Slavonic:)—Contains the  chanted at the Canon of Matins and other services.
Priest's Service Book (Greek: , ; Slavonic:) It contains the portions of the services which are said by the priest and deacon and is given to a deacon and to a priest with his vestments at ordination. The  contains the portions of the services for the whole year which are said by the priest, the bishop or the deacon.
Bishop's Service Book (Greek:  , Slavonic:) the portions of the services which are said by the Bishop; for the Canonical Hours, this differs little from what is in the Priest's Service Book.
 It contains the Old Testament Lectionary readings appointed at Vespers and at other services during the Church year.
Gospel Book (Greek: ,  or) Book containing the 4 Gospels laid out as read at the divine services.
Patristic writings Many writings from the Church fathers are prescribed to be read at matins and, during great lent, at the hours; in practice, this is only done in some monasteries and frequently therein the abbot prescribes readings other than those in the written rubrics. Therefore, it is not customary to enumerate all the volumes required for this.
Collections (Greek: , ; Slavonic:) There are numerous smaller anthologies available which were quite common before the invention of printing but still are in common use both because of the enormous volume of a full set of liturgical texts and because the full texts have not yet been translated into several languages currently in use. Some of the anthologies are called .
Typicon (Greek: , ; Slavonic: ,  or) Contains all of the rules for the performance of the Divine Services, giving directions for every possible combination of the materials from the books mentioned above into the Daily Cycle of Services.
 is a service book that contains the Anastasima (Resurrectional) hymns of vespers, Sunday matins and other hymns.
 it contains the stichera for the morning and evening services throughout the year.
 is a liturgical book which contains the paracletic canons of the week.
Homilies some homilies of the Church Fathers are recited regularly or on special occasions, such as the Paschal Homily of St. John Chrysostom.

August, or the  including certain excerpts. The Apostolike Diakonia of the Church of Greece and some Greek-orthodox bishops have also published certain old liturgies. Such as the Liturgy of St. James and others.

Calendar

The fixed portion of the liturgical year begins on September 1. There is also a movable Paschal cycle fixed according to the date of Pascha (Easter), which is by far the most important day of the entire year. The interplay of these two cycles, plus other lesser cycles influences the manner in which the services are celebrated on a day to day level throughout the entire year.

Traditionally, the Julian Calendar has been used to calculate feast days. Beginning in 1924, several autocephalous churches adopted, for fixed dates, the Revised Julian Calendar which is aligned with the Gregorian calendar; the Paschal cycle, however, continued to be calculated according to the Julian Calendar. Today, some churches and portions of some other churches continue to follow the Julian Calendar while others follow the Revised Julian (Eastern Orthodox) or Gregorian (usually the more Latinized Byzantine Catholic) Calendar. Among Eastern Orthodox, only the Orthodox Church of Finland has adopted the Western calculation of the date of Pascha (see computus); all other Orthodox Churches, and a number of Eastern Catholic Churches, as well as the Ukrainian Lutheran Church, celebrate Pascha according to the ancient rules.

Liturgical cycles
Various cycles of the liturgical year influence the manner in which the materials from the liturgical books (above) are inserted into the daily services:

Weekly cycle
Each day of the week has its own commemoration:
Sunday—Resurrection of Christ
Monday—The Holy Angels
Tuesday—St. John the Forerunner
Wednesday—The Cross and the Theotokos
Thursday—The Holy Apostles and St. Nicholas
Friday—The Cross
Saturday—All Saints and the departed

Fixed cycle
Commemorations on the Fixed Cycle depend upon the day of the calendar year, and also, occasionally, specific days of the week that fall near specific calendar dates, e.g., the Sunday before the Exaltation of the Cross.

Paschal cycle
The commemorations on the Paschal Cycle ("Movable Cycle") depend upon the date of Pascha (Easter). The cycle of the  continues through the following great lent, so the variable parts of the lenten services are determined by both the preceding year's and the current year's dates of Easter.

8 Week cycle of the octoechos

11 Week cycle of the matins gospels
The portions of each of the Gospels from the narration of the Resurrection through the end are divided into eleven readings which are read on successive Sundays at matins; there are hymns sung at Matins that correspond with that day's Matins Gospel.

List of Churches of Byzantine liturgical tradition

Eastern Orthodox Churches

Only autocephalous (self-governed) churches are listed; autonomous churches are considered under their mother churches. Those churches which continue to follow the old Julian Calendar are marked with an asterisk (*), while those that follow the Revised Julian Calendar are unmarked.
 Ecumenical Patriarchate of Constantinople
 Greek Orthodox Church of Alexandria
 Greek Orthodox Church of Antioch
 Greek Orthodox Church of Jerusalem*
 Russian Orthodox Church*
 Serbian Orthodox Church*
 Romanian Orthodox Church
 Bulgarian Orthodox Church
 Georgian Orthodox Church*
 Church of Cyprus
 Church of Greece
 Albanian Orthodox Church
 Polish Orthodox Church*
 Orthodox Church of the Czech Lands and Slovakia
 Orthodox Church in America
 Macedonian Orthodox Church
 Orthodox Church of Ukraine

Eastern Catholic Churches

Within Eastern Catholicism, several Eastern Catholic Churches are using Byzantine Rite, in its original Greek or some other form (Slavic, Romanian, Hungarian, Albanian).

History
During the early Middle Ages, Byzantine liturgical practices were employed in some (mainly southern) regions of Byzantine Italy. Churches in those regions were returned to papal authority after the Norman conquest of southern Italy in the 11th century, thus creating the base for inclusion of local Byzantine-Rite communities into the Catholic Church. Most notable among those communities was the famous Monastery of Saint Mary of Grottaferrata.

Since the Union of Florence (1439), several efforts were made towards promotion of church union among Orthodox Slavs, who were employing Church Slavic variant of Byzantine Rite in their liturgy. In Latin terminology, Eastern Slavs were also known under an exonymic designation as Ruthenians, and thus an Eastern Slavic form of Byzantine Rite came to be known as the Ruthenian Rite.

Since the 14th century, several regions of the former Kievan Rus' came under the rule of the Grand Duchy of Lithuania, and the Kingdom of Poland, that later created the Polish–Lithuanian Commonwealth. By the end of the 16th century, many among Orthodox Slavs within the borders of the Commonwealth accepted union with the Catholic Church, but kept their Slavic variant of Byzantine Rite, commonly known as Ruthenian Rite in Latin terminology. What was historically called the Ruthenian Uniate Church was set up to accommodate the local Christians and their ecclesiastic leadership under the Catholic umbrella in a state known for its religious tolerance. At the time, the religious boundaries of the Schism were comparatively fluid, and the leadership of what is now western Ukraine had from the 13th to the 15th centuries repeatedly vacillated between eastern and western leadership. The Union of Brest in 1595 finalized the shift of the Orthodox leadership of the lands of White and Little Russia (modern Belarus and Ukraine) to Uniate status. The population of those countries became Greek Catholic without a break in administration. Later, when Muscovite Russia conquered the same, the ecclesiastical leadership largely switched its allegiance again. The modern Ukrainian, Ruthenian, and Hungarian Greek Catholic Churches (approx. 5 million total) compose the great majority of Greek Catholics today, but are only a fraction of the early modern Greek Catholic or Uniate population.

The last Greek Catholic congregation of any size, the Arabic-speaking Melkite Greek Catholic Church (approx. 1.5 million), predominantly resident in Syria and with a large diaspora, is descended from a split within the far more numerous Eastern Orthodox Patriarchate of Antioch (approx. 4.3 million), when in 1729 a claimant to the Antiochene See, removed from his position by the Ottoman authorities, received recognition by the Papacy as the legitimate incumbent. The Melkite Patriarch is presently resident in Damascus, having fled the city of Antioch upon its annexation by Turkey in 1939, a move disputed by Syria.

The Byzantine Rite is distinct from other Eastern Catholic liturgies, themselves using the Aramaic-Syriac, Armenian, and Coptic liturgies of the Oriental Orthodox churches that separated from both Greek and Latin worlds before the Great Schism.

Particular Churches

These Particular Churches are considered sui iuris churches (autonomous) in full communion with the Holy See

 Albanian Greek Catholic Church
 Belarusian Greek Catholic Church
 Bulgarian Greek Catholic Church
 Greek Catholic Church of Croatia and Serbia
 Greek Byzantine Catholic Church
 Melkite Greek Catholic Church
 Hungarian Greek Catholic Church
 Italo-Albanian Catholic Church
 Macedonian Greek Catholic Church
 Romanian Greek Catholic Church
 Russian Greek Catholic Church
 Ruthenian Greek Catholic Church
 Slovak Greek Catholic Church
 Ukrainian Greek Catholic Church*

Note: Georgian Byzantine-Rite Catholics are not recognized as a particular Church (cf. canon 27 of the Code of Canons of the Eastern Churches).

Byzantine Rite Lutheranism

 The Ukrainian Lutheran Church uses liturgical formulae from the Byzantine Rite to form the base text for the Order of Service in the Ukrainian Evangelical Service Book, as well as the Revised Julian Calendar.
 It has also been used by the German Eastern Rite Community (Ostkirchlicher Konvent), St. Valentine's Lutheran Fellowship of the Grand Canyon Synod (ELCA), and in the Evangelical Lutheran Church of the Augsburg Confession in Slovenia.
 Several other Lutheran communities also use the Byzantine Rite that has been adapted to Lutheran theology.

Society for Eastern Rite Anglicanism
It has also been employed, although less frequently, in the Anglican Communion, e.g., its being utilized by the Society for Eastern Rite Anglicanism.

See also
Other Eastern liturgical rites:
 Alexandrian Rite
 Antiochene Rite
 Armenian Rite
 East Syriac Rite
 West Syriac Rite

Notes

References

Sources

External links
Byzantine rite in Italy - the tradition of the Italo-Greek-Albanian Church
Fr. Ronald Roberson's book The Eastern Christian Churches – A Brief Survey is the most up-to-date primer on these churches, available online at Catholic Near-East Welfare Association (CNEWA).
Rites of the Catholic Church Giga-catholic website
Study Text of the Divine Liturgy of Saint John Chrysostom
 Study Text of the Divine Liturgy of Saint Basil the Great
The Divine Music Project - thousands of pages of Byzantine music in English for Byzantine rite services
Text of the Union of Brest (translation)
 The Byzantine-Slavic Rite

 
4th-century establishments in the Byzantine Empire
Catholic liturgical rites
Christian terminology
Eastern Christian liturgies
Medieval Greek